The Black Sorrows are an Australian blues rock band formed in 1983 by mainstay vocalist Joe Camilleri. The band is most well known for their songs "Chained to the Wheel", "Harley + Rose" and "Never Let Me Go", released in the late '80s and early '90s. Faithful Satellite, released in September 2016, is the band's 18th studio album. Citizen John was released in March 2019.

Albums

Studio albums

Live albums

Compilations

Singles

References

Discographies of Australian artists
Rock music group discographies